Yei Airport is an airport serving Yei in South Sudan.

Location
Yei Airport  is located in Yei County in Yei River State, in the city of Yei, in the southwestern part of South Sudan, near the International borders with Uganda and the Democratic Republic of the Congo. The airport is located northeast of the central business district, on the road to Juba.

The geographic coordinates of this airport are: 4° 7' 57.00"N, 30° 43' 17.00"E (Latitude: 4.132500; Longitude: 30.721390). The airport has a single unpaved runway, the dimensions of which are not publicly known at this time.

Airlines and destinations

See also
 Yei, South Sudan
 Central Equatoria
 Equatoria
 List of airports in South Sudan

References

External links
 Location of Yei Airport At Google Maps

Airports in South Sudan
Central Equatoria
Equatoria